is a Japanese publishing company based in Chiyoda, Tokyo. It is known for publishing subculture-oriented fashion magazines aimed at teens, fashion magazines in general, as well as guide books.

History
The company was founded on September 22, 1971 as a consulting business of local government titled . Established by some Waseda University former revolutionary students, in May 1974 it started to publish its first magazine, Takarajima, a Japanese subculture focused magazine, which was followed by Bessatsu Takarajima in March 1976. Kono Mystery ga Sugoi!, a guide book magazine, was first published in December 1989, while fashion magazine Cutie was first published in September 1989. On April 1, 1993, its name changed to Takarajimasha. Smart, Spring, and Sweet, all young-targeted fashion magazines, are published since October 1995, February 1996, and March 1999 respectively. Takarajimasha is also known for creating in 2005 the concept of "brand mook", a mook featuring a catalogue of new items of a brand and limited edition product of this brand.

Publications

Fashion
Targeted to teen girls
Cutie
Spring
Mini
Steady

Targeted to women in their 20s and 30s
Sweet
InRed

Targeted to women in their 40s
Glow

Targeted to men
Smart 
Men's Roses

Other

Notes

References

External links

1971 establishments in Japan
Book publishing companies in Tokyo
Magazine publishing companies in Tokyo
Publishing companies established in 1971